Connie Needham (born Connie Marie Bowen; December 5, 1959) is an American actress and dance instructor. As Connie Newton, she portrayed Elizabeth Bradford on the television series Eight is Enough from 1977 to 1981.

Career
Although her most prominent role was as Elizabeth Bradford on the 112 episodes of the series Eight is Enough and its two subsequent television movies, Needham had nine other appearances after that series ended in 1981.

Needham portrayed two different characters during the run of the television series Fame. Her first appearance was in the episode "To Soar and Never Falter" (1982) as Kathy Murphy, a dancer in the initial stages of multiple sclerosis. The episode won Harry Harris an Emmy Award for Outstanding Directing in a Drama Series. Her other appearances on Fame were as Kelly Hayden in three episodes the following year.

Needham made a guest appearance on the Leslie Nielsen comedy TV series Police Squad! as Jill, a dance teacher who attracts the line "When she leaves, put a tail on her". She appeared in an episode of L.A. Law in 1987, and made her final appearance as a waitress in a 1995 episode of Ellen.

As of November 2006, Needham was working as a dance instructor in Orange County, California, teaching junior jazz and lyrical classes and choreographing team competitions and annual recitals.

Personal life
While credited on screen as Connie Newton, she married David Needham, a set designer on Eight is Enough, on April 7, 1979, during a late season 3 hiatus of the series. Newton switched her screen name to her married name, Connie Needham, from season 4 onwards. David Needham's father is stuntman and film director/producer Hal Needham. Connie and David divorced in 2005. They have two daughters, Kimberly and Taylor.

In July 2009, it was announced that Needham was diagnosed with ovarian cancer. She has since made a full recovery.

Filmography

Notes

External links

1959 births
Living people
Actresses from Anaheim, California
Actresses from California
American female dancers
Dancers from California
American television actresses
20th-century American actresses
21st-century American women